Fujiwara no Ariie (藤原有家 1155–1216) was a waka poet and Japanese nobleman active in the Heian period and early Kamakura period. He is designated as a member of the

External links 
E-text of his poems in Japanese

Japanese poets
Fujiwara clan
1155 deaths
1216 deaths